Peter Garretson (Lt Col, USAF), is a United States Air Force officer and a writer on space policy and strategy.  Garretson is also an instructor at Air University's Air Command and Staff College, where he leads the Space Horizons Research Task Force.  He was previously Division Chief of Irregular Strategy, Plans and Policy.  Garretson served as a visiting fellow at India's premier strategic think tank, the Institute for Defence Studies and Analyses as a Council on Foreign Relations international affairs fellow.  His team won the SECDEF/SECSTATE Diplomacy Development Defense D3 Innovation Challenge.   he is funded by the OSD MINERVA initiative to study contemporary great power attitudes toward space expansionism, territoriality, and resource nationalism.

References

Living people
Year of birth missing (living people)
United States Air Force officers
Air University (United States Air Force) faculty